Jalal ad-Din Ali ibn Qara Yoluq Osman, or Ali Beg was the sixth bey of the Turkoman tribal federation of the Aq Qoyunlu from 1435 to 1438.

Life 
Jalal ad-Din Ali ibn Qara Yoluq Osman was born into the Bayandur tribe of the Aq Qoyunlu confederation. He was the third son of Uthman Beg (1350–1435), the leader of the Aq Qoyunlu. He married his cousin, Sara Khatun. They had seven sons and one daughter, including Uzun Hasan and Jahangir Mirza, as well as Khadija Begum, who later married Shaykh Junayd of the Safavid dynasty.

In 1435, after the death of his father in the Battle of Erzurum, Ali became the new ruler of Aq Qoyunlu, since his two older brothers had already died at that time. The Timurid crown prince Muhammad Juki had recognized Ali Beg the ruler of Âmid (modern-day Diyarbakır) and as the bey of the Aq Qoyunlu. However, Ali encountered the opposition of his brothers, uncles, and cousins. His cousin Kilij Arslan Bayandur, who ruled Palu in modern-day Elazığ, wanted to take over the beylik with the help of Qara Iskander of the Kara Koyunlu, but he could not succeed. On the other hand, when his brother Sultan Hamza, who was controlling Mardin and was supported by his others brothers, Mehmet and Mahmut, and his mother, Seljuk Hatun, captured Âmid, he was recognized as "great bey" by several Aq Qoyunlu princes. Ali Beg, now pushed out of the capital, went to his brother Yakub, who was the ruler of Erzincan and Karahisar. Ali's sons Husein, Jahangir and Uzun Hasan also joined their father's ranks. However, since nothing could be done against Hamza, Ali had to take shelter in the Ottoman Sultan Murad II. Murad II gave him İskilip as dirlik, but he did not stay there long and went to his sons in Erzincan. Ali abdicated and went into voluntary exile in Aleppo in January 1439, and remained there until his death. Ḥamza was then the most powerful Aq Qoyunlu chief, but he died in 1444. The struggle for leadership resumed between Shaikh Hasan, and Jahangir.

Family
By Sara Khatun he had seven sons and a daughter: 
 Jahangir Mirza Beg
 Uzun Hasan Beg
 Hussein Beg
 Jahanshah Beg
 Iskander Beg
 Ibrahim Beg
 Uveysh Beg
 Khadija Beyim Khatun. She married Shaykh Junayd of Safavid dynasty between 1456 and 1459. Their son, Haydar Safavi, married his cousin Alamshah Halima Khatun, daughter of Uzun Hassan and Teodora Despina Khatun, and was father of Ismail I and grandfather of Tahmasp I.

References

Sources

Further reading 
 
 
 
 
 

Aq Qoyunlu rulers
15th-century births
1444 deaths
15th-century monarchs in the Middle East